Black Sabbath is the debut studio album by English heavy metal band Black Sabbath, released on 13 February 1970 by Vertigo Records in the United Kingdom and Warner Bros. Records in the United States on 1 June 1970. The album is widely regarded as the first heavy metal album, and the opening track, "Black Sabbath", has been referred to as the first doom metal song.

Upon release, the album reached number eight on the UK Albums Charts and number 23 on the US Billboard 200. Black Sabbath is included in Robert Dimery's 2005 musical reference book 1001 Albums You Must Hear Before You Die.

Recording
According to Black Sabbath's guitarist and founding member Tony Iommi, the group's debut album was recorded in a single twelve-hour session on 16 October 1969. Iommi said: "We just went in the studio and did it in a day, we played our live set and that was it. We actually thought a whole day was quite a long time, then off we went the next day to play for £20 in Switzerland." Aside from the bells, thunder and rain sound effects added to the beginning of the opening track and the double-tracked guitar solos on "N.I.B." and "Sleeping Village", there were virtually no overdubs added to the album. Iommi recalls recording live: "We thought, 'We have two days to do it and one of the days is mixing.' So we played live. Ozzy was singing at the same time, we just put him in a separate booth and off we went. We never had a second run of most of the stuff."

The key to the band's new sound on the album was Iommi's distinctive playing style that he developed after an accident at a sheet metal factory where he was working at the age of 17 in which the tips of the middle fingers of his fretting hand were severed. Iommi created a pair of false fingertips using plastic from a dish detergent bottle and detuned the strings on his guitar to make it easier for him to bend the strings, creating a massive, heavy sound. "I'd play a load of chords and I'd have to play fifths because I couldn't play fourths because of my fingers," Iommi explained to Phil Alexander in Mojo in 2013. "That helped me develop my style of playing, bending the strings and hitting the open string at the same time just to make the sound wilder." In the same article bassist Geezer Butler added, "Back then the bass player was supposed to do all these melodic runs, but I didn't know how to do that because I'd been a guitarist, so all I did was follow Tony's riff. That made the sound heavier."

Iommi began recording the album with a white Fender Stratocaster, his guitar of choice at the time, but a malfunctioning pickup forced him to finish recording with a Gibson SG, a guitar he had recently purchased as a backup but had "never really played". The SG was a right-handed model which the left-handed Iommi played upside down. Soon after recording the album, he met a right-handed guitarist who was playing a left-handed SG upside down, and the two agreed to swap guitars; this is the SG that Iommi modified and later "put out to pasture" at the Hard Rock Cafe.

Black Sabbath vocalist Ozzy Osbourne has always spoken fondly of the recording of the band's debut album, stating in his autobiography I Am Ozzy, "Once we'd finished, we spent a couple of hours double-tracking some of the guitar and vocals, and that was that. Done. We were in the pub in time for last orders. It can't have taken any longer than twelve hours in total. That's how albums should be made, in my opinion." Drummer Bill Ward agrees, telling Guitar World in 2001, "I think the first album is just absolutely incredible. It's naïve, and there's an absolute sense of unity – it's not contrived in any way, shape or form. We weren't old enough to be clever. I love it all, including the mistakes!" In an interview for the Classic Albums series in 2010 Butler added, "It was literally live in the studio. I mean, (producer) Rodger Bain, I think he's a genius the way he captured the band in such a short time." In his autobiography Iron Man: My Journey Through Heaven & Hell with Black Sabbath, Iommi plays down the producer's role, insisting, "We didn't choose to work with Rodger Bain, he was chosen for us... He was good to have around, but we didn't really get a lot of advice from him. He maybe suggested a couple of things, but the songs were already fairly structured and sorted."

Genre
On release, a writer for The Boston Globe described the music of Black Sabbath as "hard blues-rock". In retrospect, AllMusic's Steve Huey feels that Black Sabbath marks "the birth of heavy metal as we now know it". In his opinion, the album "transcends its clear roots in blues-rock and psychedelia to become something more". He ascribes its "sonic ugliness" as a reflection of "the bleak industrial nightmare" of the group's hometown, Birmingham, England. Huey notes the first side's allusions to themes characteristic of heavy metal, including evil, paganism, and the occult, "as filtered through horror films and the writings of J. R. R. Tolkien, H. P. Lovecraft, and Dennis Wheatley." He characterises side two as "given over to loose blues-rock jamming learned through" the English rock band Cream.

In the opinion of the author and former Metal Maniacs magazine editor Jeff Wagner, Black Sabbath is the "generally accepted starting point" when heavy metal "became distinct from rock and roll". In his opinion, the album represented a transition from blues rock into "something uglier", and that this sound "found deeper gravity via mournful singing and a sinister rhythmic pulse". According to Rolling Stone magazine, "the album that arguably invented heavy metal was built on thunderous blues-rock". Sputnikmusic's Mike Stagno notes that Black Sabbath's combined elements of rock, jazz and blues, with heavy distortion created one of the most influential albums in the history of heavy metal. In retrospect, Black Sabbath has been lauded as perhaps the first true heavy metal album. It has also been credited as the first record in the stoner rock and goth genres.

Taking a broader perspective, Pete Prown of Vintage Guitar says, "The debut Black Sabbath album of 1970 was a watershed moment in heavy rock, but it was part of a larger trend of artists, producers, and engineers already moving towards the sound we now call hard rock and heavy metal."

Music and lyrics

Black Sabbath music and lyrics were quite dark for the time. The opening track is based almost entirely on a tritone interval played at slow tempo on the electric guitar.  In the 2010 Classic Albums documentary on the making of the band's second album Paranoid, bassist Geezer Butler claims the riff was inspired by "Mars, the Bringer of War", a movement in Gustav Holst's The Planets. Iommi reinterpreted the riff slightly and redefined the band's direction. Ward told Classic Albums, "When Oz sang 'What is this that stands before me?' it became completely different...this was a different lyric now, this was a different feel. I was playing drums to the words." The song's lyrics concern a "figure in black" which Geezer Butler claims to have seen after waking up from a nightmare. In the liner notes to the band's 1998 live album Reunion the bassist remembers:

Similarly, the lyrics of the song "N.I.B." are written from the point of view of Lucifer, who falls in love with a human woman and "becomes a better person" according to lyricist Butler. Contrary to popular belief, the name of that song is not an abbreviation for "Nativity in Black;" according to Osbourne's autobiography it is merely a reference to drummer Bill Ward's pointed goatee at the time, which was shaped as a fountain pen-nib. The lyrics of two other songs on the album were written about stories with mythological themes. "Behind the Wall of Sleep" is a reference to the H. P. Lovecraft short story "Beyond the Wall of Sleep," while "The Wizard" was inspired by the character of Gandalf from The Hobbit and The Lord of the Rings. The latter includes harmonica playing by Osbourne. The band also recorded a cover of "Evil Woman," a song that had been an American hit for the band Crow. In his autobiography, Iommi admits the band reluctantly agreed to do the song at the behest of their manager Jim Simpson, who insisted they record something commercial.

Artwork

The cover photograph was shot at Mapledurham Watermill, situated on the River Thames in Oxfordshire, England, by photographer Keith McMillan (credited as Keef), who was in charge of the overall design. Standing in front of the watermill is a figure dressed in a black cloak, portrayed by model Louisa Livingstone, whose identity was not widely known until 2020. "I'm sure (McMillan) said it was for Black Sabbath, but I don't know if that meant anything much to me at the time," Livingstone recalled, adding that it had been "freezing cold" during the shoot. "I had to get up at about 4 o'clock in the morning. Keith was rushing around with dry ice, throwing it into the water. It didn't seem to be working very well, so he ended up using a smoke machine," said the model.

According to McMillan, Livingstone was wearing nothing underneath the black cloak, and some experimentation was done involving some "slightly more risqué" photographs taken at the session. "We decided none of that worked," McMillan said. "Any kind of sexuality took away from the more foreboding mood. But she was a terrific model. She had amazing courage and understanding of what I was trying to do."

The inner gatefold sleeve of the original release featured an inverted cross containing a poem written by Roger Brown, McMillan's photography assistant. The band were reportedly upset when they discovered this, as it fuelled allegations that they were satanists or occultists; however, in Osbourne's memoirs, he says that to the best of his knowledge nobody was upset with the inclusion. Iommi's recollection is somewhat different: "Suddenly we had all these crazy people turning up at shows," he told Mojo magazine in 2013. "I think Alex Sanders (high priest of the Wiccan religion) turned up at a gig once. It was all quite strange, really." The liner notes to the 1998 Reunion album state "Unbeknownst to the band, Black Sabbath was launched in the U.S. with a party with the head of the Church of Satan, Anton LaVey, presiding over the proceedings... All of a sudden Sabbath were Satan's Right Hand Men."

In the years since the iconic cover photo was shot, Livingstone has released electronic music under the name Indreba.

Release and reception
Black Sabbath was recorded for Fontana Records, but prior to release the record company elected to switch the band to another of their labels, Vertigo Records, which housed the company's more progressive acts. Released on Friday the 13th February 1970 by Vertigo Records, Black Sabbath reached number eight on the UK Albums Charts. Following its United States release in June 1970 by Warner Bros. Records, the album reached number 23 on the Billboard 200, where it remained for more than a year and sold one million copies.

Black Sabbath received generally negative reviews from contemporary critics. Rolling Stone Lester Bangs described the band as, "just like Cream! But worse", and he dismissed the album as "a shuck – despite the murky songtitles and some inane lyrics that sound like Vanilla Fudge paying doggerel tribute to Aleister Crowley, the album has nothing to do with spiritualism, the occult, or anything much except stiff recitations of Cream clichés". Robert Christgau, writing for The Village Voice, panned the album as "bullshit necromancy". He later described it as a reflection of "the worst of the counterculture", including "drug-impaired reaction time" and "long solos".

Retrospective reviews and legacy 

Retrospective reviews of Black Sabbath have been positive. AllMusic reviewer Steve Huey said it was a highly innovative debut album with several classic metal songs, including the title track, which he felt had the "most definitive heavy metal riffs of all time". Huey was also impressed by how the band's "slowed-down, murky guitar rock bludgeons the listener in an almost hallucinatory fashion, reveling in its own dazed, druggy state of consciousness". In The Rolling Stone Album Guide (2004), journalist Scott Seward highlighted Bain's grandiose production on "an album that eats hippies for breakfast." In the opinion of Mike Stagno of Sputnikmusic, "both fans of blues influenced hard rock and heavy metal of all sorts should find something they like on the album." BBC Music's Pete Marsh referred to Black Sabbath as an "album that changed the face of rock music." In Mick Wall's book Black Sabbath: Symptom of the Universe, Butler reflects, "The London press absolutely hated us when we made it 'cos they'd never written an article about us, they didn't know of us. When our first album, the first week, went straight into the charts, the London press went, like, what the hell's going on here? And they've hated us ever since."

In 1989, Kerrang! ranked Black Sabbath number 31 on their "100 Greatest Heavy Metal Albums of All Time". In 1994, it was ranked number 12 in Colin Larkin's Top 50 Heavy Metal Albums. Larkin praised the album's "crushing atmosphere of doom", which he described as "intense and relentless". In 2000, Q magazine included Black Sabbath in their list of the "Best Metal Albums of All Time", stating: "[This album] was to prove so influential it remains a template for metal bands three decades on." In 2003, it was ranked number 241 on Rolling Stone magazine's list of the 500 Greatest Albums of All Time, 243 in a 2012 revised list, and 355 in a 2020 revised list. Rolling Stone ranked Black Sabbath number 44 in their list of the 100 Best Debut Albums of All Time, describing the title track as the song that "would define the sound of a thousand bands". Additionally, in 2017, the magazine ranked it 5th on their list of "100 Greatest Metal Albums of All Time". The album was also included in the book 1001 Albums You Must Hear Before You Die.

Track listing
All songs credited to Tony Iommi, Geezer Butler, Bill Ward and Ozzy Osbourne, except where noted.

European edition

North American edition

The original North American Warner Bros. Records pressings of Black Sabbath list incorrect running times for "Wicked World" and the "Warning" medley (4:30 and 14:32, respectively), and also credit the album's original songs using the band members' given names (Anthony Iommi, John Osbourne, Terence Butler, and William Ward). The Castle Communications edition of 1986 also featured a live version of "Tomorrow's Dream" as a bonus track.

Disc two of the Deluxe Editions contains "N.I.B. (studio out-take)" with vocals, that was incorrectly listed as "N.I.B. (instrumental)".

Personnel

Black Sabbath
Ozzy Osbournelead vocals, harmonica on "The Wizard", tambourine
Tony Iommiguitar
Geezer Butlerbass
Bill Warddrums

Production
Rodger Bain production, Jew's harp on "Sleeping Village"
Tom Allom engineering
Barry Sheffield engineering
Marcus Keef graphic design, photography

Charts

Certifications

Notes

References

Bibliography

Further reading

External links

 

1970 debut albums
Albums produced by Rodger Bain
Black Sabbath albums
Castle Communications albums
Sanctuary Records albums
Vertigo Records albums
Warner Records albums